Samatcha Tovannakasem (born 11 March 1993) is a Thai male badminton player. In 2015, he won the Turkey International Series tournament in the men's doubles event partnered with Gergely Krausz of Hungary.

Achievements

BWF International Challenge/Series
Men's Doubles

 BWF International Challenge tournament
 BWF International Series tournament
 BWF Future Series tournament

References

External links 
 

Living people
1993 births
Samatcha Tovannakasem
Samatcha Tovannakasem